Iker Leonet Iza (born December 10, 1983) is a retired Spanish cyclist who last rode for . When he joined  in 2005 he was the youngest rider in the team.

Major results
Source:
2004
1st Stage 3 Vuelta a Cantabria

References

External links
 

1983 births
Living people
Spanish male cyclists
People from Oiartzun
Sportspeople from Gipuzkoa
Cyclists from the Basque Country (autonomous community)